Pierre Jallow (born 8 August 1979) is a Gambian professional basketball player. In 2015, he played for the Nilan Bisons Loimaa of Finland's Korisliiga and the VTB United League. He has received Finnish citizenship.

He organizes a camp in Gambia every summer for young kids who want a future in basketball.

References

External links
 FIBA Profile
 Afrobasket.com Profile

1979 births
Living people
Centers (basketball)
Gambian men's basketball players
Power forwards (basketball)
Torpan Pojat players
William Jewell Cardinals men's basketball players
Finnish people of Gambian descent
Gambian expatriate sportspeople in Finland
Naturalized citizens of Finland